In Greek mythology, Celtus (Keltos ) may refer to three various figures:

 Celtus, the eponymous progenitor of the Celts. There are two alternative traditions. One, found in Appian's Illyrian Wars, holds that Celtus was the son of Polyphemos and Galatea and the brother of Illyrius and Galas. The other, found in the Erotica Pathemata ("Sorrows of Love") by the 1st-century grammarian Parthenius of Nicaea, and also known from the medieval Etymologicum Magnum, has Celtus as the son of Heracles and Celtine.
 Celtus, son of Periboea and Meges, a rich man son of Dymas. He was killed by Neoptolemus.
 Celtus, one of the Suitors of Penelope who came from Zacynthus along with other 43 wooers. He, with the other suitors, was slain by Odysseus with the help of Eumaeus, Philoetius, and Telemachus.

Notes

References 

 Apollodorus, The Library with an English Translation by Sir James George Frazer, F.B.A., F.R.S. in 2 Volumes, Cambridge, MA, Harvard University Press; London, William Heinemann Ltd. 1921. ISBN 0-674-99135-4. Online version at the Perseus Digital Library. Greek text available from the same website.
 Parthenius, Love Romances translated by Sir Stephen Gaselee (1882-1943), S. Loeb Classical Library Volume 69. Cambridge, MA. Harvard University Press. 1916.  Online version at the Topos Text Project.
 Parthenius, Erotici Scriptores Graeci, Vol. 1. Rudolf Hercher. in aedibus B. G. Teubneri. Leipzig. 1858. Greek text available at the Perseus Digital Library.
 Quintus Smyrnaeus, The Fall of Troy translated by Way. A. S. Loeb Classical Library Volume 19. London: William Heinemann, 1913. Online version at theio.com
 Quintus Smyrnaeus, The Fall of Troy. Arthur S. Way. London: William Heinemann; New York: G.P. Putnam's Sons. 1913. Greek text available at the Perseus Digital Library.

Children of Heracles
Trojans
Suitors of Penelope
Mythology of Heracles